The 1989–90 NBA season was the Jazz's 16th season in the National Basketball Association, and 11th season in Salt Lake City, Utah. The Jazz got off to a fast start early into the season by winning seven of their first eight games. They continued to play solid basketball winning 11 of their 14 games in January, including a nine-game winning streak, and holding a 33–14 record at the All-Star break. The Jazz finished with an impressive 55–27 record, second in the Midwest Division. They made their seventh consecutive trip to the playoffs.

Karl Malone averaged 31.0 points, 11.1 rebounds and 1.5 steals per game, and was named to the All-NBA First Team, and also finished in fourth place in Most Valuable Player voting. Meanwhile, John Stockton averaged 17.2 points, led the league in assists for the third year in a row averaging 14.5 assists, and contributed 2.7 steals per game, and was selected to the All-NBA Second Team. In addition, Thurl Bailey provided the team with 14.2 points and 5.0 rebounds per game, while Darrell Griffith and top draft pick Blue Edwards both contributed 8.9 points per game each, with Edwards being named to the NBA All-Rookie Second Team, and Mark Eaton provided with 7.3 rebounds and led the team with 2.5 blocks per game.

Both Malone and Stockton were selected for the 1990 NBA All-Star Game. However, Malone threatened to boycott the All-Star Game, after A.C. Green of the Los Angeles Lakers was voted to be the starting power forward for the Western Conference instead of Malone. Malone did not play in the All-Star Game due to an ankle injury, despite playing all 82 games this season. In the Western Conference First Round of the playoffs, the Jazz won Game 1 against the 5th-seeded Phoenix Suns, but lost the series in five games. Following the season, Bob Hansen was traded to the Sacramento Kings in an off-season three team trade.

One notable highlight of the season was Malone scoring a career-high of 61 points in a 144–96 home win over the Milwaukee Bucks on January 27, 1990.

Draft picks

Roster

Regular season

Season standings

Record vs. opponents

Game log

Regular season

|- align="center" bgcolor="#ccffcc"
| 1
| November 3
| Denver
| W 122–113
|
|
|
| Salt Palace
| 1–0
|- align="center" bgcolor="#ccffcc"
| 2
| November 8
| Charlotte
| W 102–86
|
|
|
| Salt Palace
| 2–0
|- align="center" bgcolor="#ccffcc"
| 3
| November 10
| San Antonio
| W 106–92
|
|
|
| Salt Palace
| 3–0
|- align="center" bgcolor="#ffcccc"
| 4
| November 11
| @ Houston
| L 92–100
|
|
|
| The Summit
| 3–1
|- align="center" bgcolor="#ccffcc"
| 5
| November 13
| Washington
| W 106–93
|
|
|
| Salt Palace
| 4–1
|- align="center" bgcolor="#ccffcc"
| 6
| November 15
| Chicago
| W 108–107
|
|
|
| Salt Palace
| 5–1
|- align="center" bgcolor="#ccffcc"
| 7
| November 17
| Indiana
| W 114–100
|
|
|
| Salt Palace
| 6–1
|- align="center" bgcolor="#ccffcc"
| 8
| November 21
| @ Minnesota
| W 103–101 (OT)
|
|
|
| Hubert H. Humphrey Metrodome
| 7–1
|- align="center" bgcolor="#ffcccc"
| 9
| November 22
| Orlando
| L 97–119
|
|
|
| Salt Palace
| 7–2
|- align="center" bgcolor="#ffcccc"
| 10
| November 25
| L.A. Lakers
| L 86–92
|
|
|
| Salt Palace
| 7–3
|- align="center" bgcolor="#ccffcc"
| 11
| November 27
| New Jersey
| W 105–68
|
|
|
| Salt Palace
| 8–3
|- align="center" bgcolor="#ffcccc"
| 12
| November 29
| @ Indiana
| L 88–100
|
|
|
| Market Square Arena
| 8–4

|- align="center" bgcolor="#ffcccc"
| 13
| December 1
| @ Atlanta
| L 103–114
|
|
|
| The Omni
| 8–5
|- align="center" bgcolor="#ccffcc"
| 14
| December 2
| @ Washington
| W 100–98
|
|
|
| Capital Centre
| 9–5
|- align="center" bgcolor="#ccffcc"
| 15
| December 5
| @ Cleveland
| W 94–80
|
|
|
| Richfield Coliseum
| 10–5
|- align="center" bgcolor="#ccffcc"
| 16
| December 7
| Dallas
| W 107–97
|
|
|
| Salt Palace
| 11–5
|- align="center" bgcolor="#ccffcc"
| 17
| December 9
| Houston
| W 104–90
|
|
|
| Salt Palace
| 12–5
|- align="center" bgcolor="#ffcccc"
| 18
| December 11
| Cleveland
| L 110–113 (OT)
|
|
|
| Salt Palace
| 12–6
|- align="center" bgcolor="#ccffcc"
| 19
| December 13
| Phoenix
| W 102–95
|
|
|
| Salt Palace
| 13–6
|- align="center" bgcolor="#ccffcc"
| 20
| December 15
| Detroit
| W 94–91
|
|
|
| Salt Palace
| 14–6
|- align="center" bgcolor="#ccffcc"
| 21
| December 17
| @ Minnesota
| W 122–112
|
|
|
| Hubert H. Humphrey Metrodome
| 15–6
|- align="center" bgcolor="#ffcccc"
| 22
| December 19
| @ New York
| L 107–115
|
|
|
| Madison Square Garden
| 15–7
|- align="center" bgcolor="#ffcccc"
| 23
| December 20
| @ Boston
| L 109–113
|
|
|
| Boston Garden
| 15–8
|- align="center" bgcolor="#ccffcc"
| 24
| December 22
| @ Charlotte
| W 114–100
|
|
|
| Charlotte Coliseum
| 16–8
|- align="center" bgcolor="#ffcccc"
| 25
| December 23
| @ San Antonio
| L 98–115
|
|
|
| HemisFair Arena
| 16–9
|- align="center" bgcolor="#ccffcc"
| 26
| December 26
| Golden State
| W 133–118
|
|
|
| Salt Palace
| 17–9
|- align="center" bgcolor="#ccffcc"
| 27
| December 28
| Portland
| W 113–109
|
|
|
| Salt Palace
| 18–9
|- align="center" bgcolor="#ccffcc"
| 28
| December 30
| Miami
| W 117–98
|
|
|
| Salt Palace
| 19–9

|- align="center" bgcolor="#ffcccc"
| 29
| January 2
| @ Golden State
| L 120–133
|
|
|
| Oakland–Alameda County Coliseum Arena
| 19–10
|- align="center" bgcolor="#ccffcc"
| 30
| January 3
| @ Seattle
| W 119–108
|
|
|
| Seattle Center Coliseum
| 20–10
|- align="center" bgcolor="#ffcccc"
| 31
| January 5
| @ Portland
| L 89–118
|
|
|
| Memorial Coliseum
| 20–11
|- align="center" bgcolor="#ccffcc"
| 32
| January 6
| @ Denver
| W 123–120
|
|
|
| McNichols Sports Arena
| 21–11
|- align="center" bgcolor="#ccffcc"
| 33
| January 10
| Denver
| W 130–99
|
|
|
| Salt Palace
| 22–11
|- align="center" bgcolor="#ccffcc"
| 34
| January 13
| @ Dallas
| W 109–99
|
|
|
| Reunion Arena
| 23–11
|- align="center" bgcolor="#ccffcc"
| 35
| January 17
| Atlanta
| W 95–88
|
|
|
| Salt Palace
| 24–11
|- align="center" bgcolor="#ccffcc"
| 36
| January 19
| Charlotte
| W 116–93
|
|
|
| Salt Palace
| 25–11
|- align="center" bgcolor="#ccffcc"
| 37
| January 20
| @ Sacramento
| W 94–81
|
|
|
| ARCO Arena
| 26–11
|- align="center" bgcolor="#ccffcc"
| 38
| January 23
| Houston
| W 102–94
|
|
|
| Salt Palace
| 27–11
|- align="center" bgcolor="#ccffcc"
| 39
| January 25
| New York
| W 115–89
|
|
|
| Salt Palace
| 28–11
|- align="center" bgcolor="#ccffcc"
| 40
| January 27
| Milwaukee
| W 144–96
|
|
|
| Salt Palace
| 29–11
|- align="center" bgcolor="#ffcccc"
| 41
| January 30
| @ Portland
| L 98–122
|
|
|
| Memorial Coliseum
| 29–12
|- align="center" bgcolor="#ccffcc"
| 42
| January 31
| L.A. Clippers
| W 120–101
|
|
|
| Salt Palace
| 30–12

|- align="center" bgcolor="#ccffcc"
| 43
| February 2
| Dallas
| W 105–92
|
|
|
| Salt Palace
| 31–12
|- align="center" bgcolor="#ffcccc"
| 44
| February 4
| @ Detroit
| L 83–115
|
|
|
| The Palace of Auburn Hills
| 31–13
|- align="center" bgcolor="#ffcccc"
| 45
| February 5
| @ Philadelphia
| L 89–114
|
|
|
| The Spectrum
| 31–14
|- align="center" bgcolor="#ccffcc"
| 46
| February 7
| @ New Jersey
| W 108–101
|
|
|
| Brendan Byrne Arena
| 32–14
|- align="center" bgcolor="#ccffcc"
| 47
| February 8
| @ Charlotte
| W 94–74
|
|
|
| Charlotte Coliseum
| 33–14
|- align="center" bgcolor="#ccffcc"
| 48
| February 13
| Minnesota
| W 110–104 (OT)
|
|
|
| Salt Palace
| 34–14
|- align="center" bgcolor="#ffcccc"
| 49
| February 14
| @ Phoenix
| L 103–114
|
|
|
| Arizona Veterans Memorial Coliseum
| 34–15
|- align="center" bgcolor="#ffcccc"
| 50
| February 16
| @ San Antonio
| L 86–100
|
|
|
| HemisFair Arena
| 34–16
|- align="center" bgcolor="#ccffcc"
| 51
| February 17
| Sacramento
| W 110–106
|
|
|
| Salt Palace
| 35–16
|- align="center" bgcolor="#ccffcc"
| 52
| February 19
| Philadelphia
| W 115–102
|
|
|
| Salt Palace
| 36–16
|- align="center" bgcolor="#ccffcc"
| 53
| February 21
| Boston
| W 116–103
|
|
|
| Salt Palace
| 37–16
|- align="center" bgcolor="#ccffcc"
| 54
| February 22
| @ L.A. Clippers
| W 116–102
|
|
|
| Los Angeles Memorial Sports Arena
| 38–16
|- align="center" bgcolor="#ccffcc"
| 55
| February 25
| @ L.A. Lakers
| W 104–103
|
|
|
| Great Western Forum
| 39–16

|- align="center" bgcolor="#ccffcc"
| 56
| March 1
| Portland
| W 119–102
|
|
|
| Salt Palace
| 40–16
|- align="center" bgcolor="#ccffcc"
| 57
| March 3
| San Antonio
| W 112–98
|
|
|
| Salt Palace
| 41–16
|- align="center" bgcolor="#ffcccc"
| 58
| March 5
| @ Miami
| L 104–105
|
|
|
| Miami Arena
| 41–17
|- align="center" bgcolor="#ccffcc"
| 59
| March 6
| @ Orlando
| W 111–101
|
|
|
| Orlando Arena
| 42–17
|- align="center" bgcolor="#ccffcc"
| 60
| March 8
| @ Chicago
| W 98–94
|
|
|
| Chicago Stadium
| 43–17
|- align="center" bgcolor="#ccffcc"
| 61
| March 9
| @ Milwaukee
| W 108–100
|
|
|
| Bradley Center
| 44–17
|- align="center" bgcolor="#ccffcc"
| 62
| March 11
| @ Denver
| W 110–109
|
|
|
| McNichols Sports Arena
| 45–17
|- align="center" bgcolor="#ffcccc"
| 63
| March 13
| Phoenix
| L 106–114
|
|
|
| Salt Palace
| 45–18
|- align="center" bgcolor="#ccffcc"
| 64
| March 15
| Seattle
| W 117–95
|
|
|
| Salt Palace
| 46–18
|- align="center" bgcolor="#ffcccc"
| 65
| March 17
| @ Sacramento
| L 109–122 (OT)
|
|
|
| ARCO Arena
| 46–19
|- align="center" bgcolor="#ccffcc"
| 66
| March 19
| Sacramento
| W 105–97
|
|
|
| Salt Palace
| 47–19
|- align="center" bgcolor="#ccffcc"
| 67
| March 21
| L.A. Clippers
| W 118–102
|
|
|
| Salt Palace
| 48–19
|- align="center" bgcolor="#ccffcc"
| 68
| March 23
| Golden State
| W 106–91
|
|
|
| Salt Palace
| 49–19
|- align="center" bgcolor="#ccffcc"
| 69
| March 24
| @ L.A. Clippers
| W 112–79
|
|
|
| Los Angeles Memorial Sports Arena
| 50–19
|- align="center" bgcolor="#ffcccc"
| 70
| March 29
| @ Golden State
| L 123–128
|
|
|
| Oakland–Alameda County Coliseum Arena
| 50–20

|- align="center" bgcolor="#ffcccc"
| 71
| April 1
| @ L.A. Lakers
| L 103–119
|
|
|
| Great Western Forum
| 50–21
|- align="center" bgcolor="#ccffcc"
| 72
| April 3
| Charlotte
| W 127–104
|
|
|
| Salt Palace
| 51–21
|- align="center" bgcolor="#ffcccc"
| 73
| April 5
| @ Seattle
| L 91–101
|
|
|
| Seattle Center Coliseum
| 51–22
|- align="center" bgcolor="#ffcccc"
| 74
| April 9
| @ Phoenix
| L 115–119 (OT)
|
|
|
| Arizona Veterans Memorial Coliseum
| 51–23
|- align="center" bgcolor="#ccffcc"
| 75
| April 10
| Seattle
| W 114–102
|
|
|
| Salt Palace
| 52–23
|- align="center" bgcolor="#ccffcc"
| 76
| April 12
| L.A. Lakers
| W 107–104
|
|
|
| Salt Palace
| 53–23
|- align="center" bgcolor="#ffcccc"
| 77
| April 14
| Houston
| L 99–103
|
|
|
| Salt Palace
| 53–24
|- align="center" bgcolor="#ccffcc"
| 78
| April 15
| @ Minnesota
| W 103–90
|
|
|
| Hubert H. Humphrey Metrodome
| 54–24
|- align="center" bgcolor="#ffcccc"
| 79
| April 17
| @ Dallas
| L 96–97
|
|
|
| Reunion Arena
| 54–25
|- align="center" bgcolor="#ffcccc"
| 80
| April 18
| @ San Antonio
| L 93–102
|
|
|
| HemisFair Arena
| 54–26
|- align="center" bgcolor="#ccffcc"
| 81
| April 20
| Minnesota
| W 97–89
|
|
|
| Salt Palace
| 55–26
|- align="center" bgcolor="#ffcccc"
| 82
| April 22
| @ Houston
| L 88–100
|
|
|
| The Summit
| 55–27

Playoffs

|- align="center" bgcolor="#ccffcc"
| 1
| April 27
| Phoenix
| W 113–96
| Karl Malone (21)
| Karl Malone (11)
| John Stockton (17)
| Salt Palace12,616
| 1–0
|- align="center" bgcolor="#ffcccc"
| 2
| April 29
| Phoenix
| L 87–105
| Karl Malone (20)
| Karl Malone (10)
| John Stockton (8)
| Salt Palace12,616
| 1–1
|- align="center" bgcolor="#ffcccc"
| 3
| May 2
| @ Phoenix
| L 105–120
| Thurl Bailey (30)
| Karl Malone (11)
| John Stockton (19)
| Arizona Veterans Memorial Coliseum14,487
| 1–2
|- align="center" bgcolor="#ccffcc"
| 4
| May 4
| @ Phoenix
| W 105–94
| Karl Malone (33)
| Karl Malone (11)
| John Stockton (14)
| Arizona Veterans Memorial Coliseum14,487
| 2–2
|- align="center" bgcolor="#ffcccc"
| 5
| May 6
| Phoenix
| L 102–104
| Bailey, Malone (26)
| Mark Eaton (9)
| John Stockton (17)
| Salt Palace12,616
| 2–3
|-

Player statistics

Season

Playoffs

Awards and records
 Karl Malone, All-NBA First Team
 John Stockton, All-NBA Second Team
 Blue Edwards, NBA All-Rookie Team 2nd Team

Transactions

References

Utah Jazz seasons
1989 in sports in Utah
Utah
Utah